I Pledge Allegiance to the Grind is the second studio album by American rapper Killer Mike. It was released on November 21, 2006, by Grind Time Rap Gang's record label Grind Time Official. The album features guest verses from each member of the Grind Time Rap Gang such as SL Jones, Narrio, Bigg Slimm, Da Bill Collector and Rock D The Legend, and it includes two guest appearances from southern hip hop group 8Ball & MJG, and fellow American rapper Big Boi. The song "That's Life" features Killer Mike criticizing cultural and political leaders who do not care about poor people, including Oprah Winfrey, George W. Bush, Bill Clinton and Bill Cosby, a criticism that he reiterated and deepened in "That's Life II" on his album PL3DGE.

Track listing

References

2006 albums
Killer Mike albums